The Black Ghiandola is a 2017 horror short film directed by Sam Raimi, Catherine Hardwicke and Theodore Melfi and starring Johnny Depp, Laura Dern, David Lynch and J. K. Simmons. It tells the story of a young man risking his life to save a young girl he has grown to love, after his family has been killed in a zombie apocalypse. The film was a project undertaken by the Make a Film Foundation to realize the idea of Anthony Conti, a 16-year-old facing stage IV adrenal cortical cancer. The film screened at the 2017 Oceanside International Film Festival.

References

External links
 

2017 films
American short films
2017 short films
Films directed by Catherine Hardwicke
Films directed by Theodore Melfi
Films directed by Sam Raimi
Films scored by Trent Reznor
Films scored by Atticus Ross
2010s English-language films